Darío Delgado Mora (born December 14, 1985) is a Costa Rican professional footballer who currently plays for Guadalupe F.C.

Career

Professional
During the Clausura 2008 season he debuted in the Costa Rican First Division appearing in 11 games scoring 2 goals. For the 2008-2009 season, he played in 30 games in which he scored 2 goals captaining Puntarenas F.C. During the 2009 Winter Tournament he was recognized by UNAFUT as the league's top player.

In January 2010, it was rumored that he was signed by Major League Soccer team Seattle Sounders FC. In truth, Real Salt Lake had the MLS rights to Delgado. RSL traded these rights to Chivas USA in exchange for a conditional pick in the 2012 MLS SuperDraft. Chivas USA signed Delgado on a season's loan on April 4, 2010.

On January 22, 2011 Chivas USA announced that Delgado would not be part of the club for the 2011 MLS season.

Delgado transferred to Chinese club Guangdong Sunray Cave F.C. at March 2011. On 11 May 2011, he suffered a fracture of tibia and fibula during a FA Cup match against Tianjin Songjiang, ruling him out for the rest of the 2011 league season.

He ended his contract with Puntarenas in December 2013 and in January 2014 he joined Carmelita. In December 2014, Delgado moved on to Cartaginés.

International
He made his debut for Costa Rica in a May 2009 friendly match against Venezuela and has, as of May 2014, earned a total of 12 caps, scoring no goals. He represented his country in 2 FIFA World Cup qualification matches was called up for the 2009 CONCACAF Gold Cup playing 3 games. He also played at the 2011 Copa Centroamericana.

His most recent international was a February 2011 friendly against Venezuela.

References

External links
 
 Chivas 2010 season stats - MLS
Stats for Dario Delgado  (Costa Rican League Statistics)

1985 births
Living people
Association football defenders
Costa Rican men's footballers
Costa Rica international footballers
Deportivo Saprissa players
Puntarenas F.C. players
Chivas USA players
Guangdong Sunray Cave players
China League One players
A.D. Carmelita footballers
C.S. Cartaginés players
Costa Rican expatriate footballers
Expatriate soccer players in the United States
Expatriate footballers in China
Major League Soccer players
2009 CONCACAF Gold Cup players
2011 Copa Centroamericana players